Lead(IV) hydroxide, Pb(OH)4, also called ortho-plumbic acid, is the notional conjugate acid of the ortho-plumbate(IV) ion, PbO44−, found in compounds such as calcium orthoplumbate, Ca2PbO4. Like its tin analog Sn(OH)4, Pb(OH)4 has not been isolated.

References

Hydroxides
Lead(IV) compounds
Hypothetical chemical compounds